Martin Bommas (born 1967 in Heilbronn) is a German Egyptologist, archaeologist, and philologist. He is a professor and Museum Director at the Macquarie University History Museum in Sydney, Australia and the Director of the Qubbet el-Hawa Research Project (QHRP) in Aswan, Egypt. He has published widely on ancient Egyptian mortuary liturgies, rituals and religious texts spanning the Old Kingdom to the Christian era. In archaeology, he has examined the Old and Middle Kingdom settlement remains and the 18th Dynasty temple of Khnum at Elephantine as well as the Old and Middle Kingdom Lower Necropolis at Qubbet el-Hawa. As a museum director, his focus is on historical anthropology, decolonisation and the repatriation of illicitly trafficked artefacts.

Academia
Martin Bommas studied Egyptology at the University of Heidelberg, completing his M.A. in 1994 and his PhD in 2000. During this period, he worked in the Egyptological Institute of Heidelberg as a research associate in the library (1988) and a tutor of undergraduate students in Egyptology (1991-1994) before becoming Lecturer in Egyptology (1994-2002). Following his time in Heidelberg, he was appointed Assistant Professor at the Egyptological Seminar at the University of Basel in 2001-2004 and Lecturer in Egyptology in 2004-2006. During this period, he also taught Egyptology at the University of Rome (2004), the University of Zurich (2005), and the University of Sheffield (2006). In 2006 he was appointed Senior Lecturer in Egyptology at the University of Birmingham where he taught extensively in the fields of Egyptology and archaeology, and in 2014 he was selected as Reader in Egyptology at the university. He remained in this position until 2018 when he accepted his position as Museum Director at the Macquarie University History Museum, part of the Museums and Collections of Macquarie University. He served as the editor-in-chief of the Journal of Egyptian Archaeology from 2014-2018. Since 2008 he has also been the editor-in-chief of the Cultural Memory and History in Antiquity series of Bloomsbury publishing. Since 2021, he has been the Editor-in-Chief of Studies in Egyptian Archaeological Science, published by Andromeda Publisher.

Philology 
In 1994, Martin Bommas began working on religious texts at the University of Leiden, studying the early New Kingdom Papyrus Leiden I 346 on ancient Egyptian epagomenal texts (published 1999). Between 1994 and 2008, together with Jan Assmann, he edited and published Ancient Egyptian Mortuary Liturgies. Based on a papyrus from the Middle Kingdom held in Moscow, he reconstructed the ritual of investiture carried out for both living and dead pharaohs, published in 2013.

Archaeology 
Martin Bommas began his archaeological work in Pakistan in 1990 where he participated in survey and excavation work in the Karakorum region in association with the Academy of Sciences, Heidelberg. He then joined the German Archaeological Institute's mission in Elephantine, Egypt in 1990 as a research associate before being made field director in 1991. Notably, this role was maintained during the Gulf Crisis. He continued to work at Elephantine until 2009 and during this period he contributed significantly to the reconstruction of the 18th Dynasty temple of Khnum, the restoration and reconstruction of the monumental gate of Amenhotep II and Ptolemy I which once stood in the southern temenos wall of the temple of Satet, and the discovery of a First Intermediate Period/Middle Kingdom settlement north of the Sanctuary of Heqaib. Since 2015 he has directed the “Qubbet el-Hawa Research Project” (QHRP) in Aswan, now a joint excavation between Macquarie University and the Egypt Exploration Society. Among the notable discoveries at the site was the causeway of Sarenput I, which led him to receive the Luxor Times Top 10 Discoveries award in 2017. In 2016 he also discovered the Lower Necropolis of Qubbet el-Hawa dating to the Old and Middle Kingdoms.

Museums 
In the museum sector, Martin Bommas has contributed to the establishment and maintenance of temporary and permanent exhibitions around the world. He acted as a consulting Egyptologist for the establishment of the new Archaeological Museum at Elephantine in Egypt (1995-1998) and for an exhibition on Egypt in Graeco-Roman times at the Städtische Galerie Liebieghaus in Frankfurt (2003-2005), as well as a consulting archaeologist for a permanent exhibition on Egyptian gods in the Aegean world at the Archaeological Museum of Thessaloniki. Between 2010 and 2018 he served as Curator of the Eton Myers Collection of Egyptian Art at the University of Birmingham. In 2018 he moved to Macquarie University in Sydney to occupy the role of Museum Director at the Macquarie University History Museum. This Museum is part of the Arts Precinct (opened 2021) at the University and the collection comprises over 18,000 objects that span ancient cultures around the world to modern Australian history. In his role as Museum Director, Martin Bommas directed the Museum’s layout and design and he oversees the collection.

Non-archaeological discoveries 
Some notable achievements in Martin Bommas’ career include the discovery of several papyrus fragments. In 1998, he published the long lost fragments of the magical Papyrus Harris 501 that he discovered in the Von-Portheim Stiftung, Heidelberg. Between 2016 and 2017, he was resident Getty Research Scholar at the Getty Villa in Los Angeles where he discovered a large collection of unpublished hieratic papyri, mainly stemming from the Book of the Dead. This material has been published in the Google Arts & Culture online exhibition: The Getty Book of the Dead. At the Nicholson Museum at the University of Sydney, he discovered, translated and researched more unpublished papyri fragments, including a papyrus dating to the earliest period of Islam in Egypt.

Media 
Martin Bommas has participated in various media productions, such as The Verb with Ian McMillan, Jenny Uglow, Julian Glover, Amy Cooke-Hodgson and Rachel Parris. In 2016, he was featured with Dr Eman Khalifa on Radio Cairo's World of Info. Presenting new discoveries made by the QHRP at Qubbet el-Hawa, both were featured in the UK national TV Channel 5 series "Egyptian Tomb Hunting with Tony Robinson", shown on 27–28 November 2018.

References

External links

Channel 5: Egyptian Tomb Hunting with Tony Robinson http://www.channel5.com/show/egyptian-tomb-hunting/
Martin Bommas Academia Profile. Retrieved December 2019.
Martin Bommas MQ Research Portal. Retrieved December 2019.
Macquarie University History Museum. Retrieved September 2020.
Google Arts & Culture: The Getty Book of the Dead. Retrieved September 2020.
German Archaeological Institute. Retrieved September 2020.
Macquarie University History Museum. Retrieved May 2021.

German Egyptologists
1967 births
Living people
Heidelberg University alumni
Leiden University alumni
Academic staff of the University of Basel
Academics of the University of Sheffield
German expatriates in the United Kingdom
German expatriates in Australia
Academic staff of Macquarie University